Michael John "Jimmy" Roselli (December 26, 1925 – June 30, 2011) was one of the most significant Italian-American pop singers of his time, during an era of competition from such performers as Frank Sinatra, Tony Bennett, Dean Martin, Perry Como, Frankie Laine, Vic Damone, Al Martino, and Jerry Vale.

Early life
Roselli was born in Hoboken, New Jersey, the son of Anna Bernadette Lovella, a seamstress, and Phillip Roselli, a boxer. His mother died two days after he was born and his father abandoned him, leaving him in the care of his aunts and his widowed grandfather, Michael Roselli, who spoke no English. He grew up five doors down from Frank Sinatra, who was ten years his senior. In 1944, Roselli joined the United States Army, serving in the 66th Infantry Division. After the war, he returned to Hoboken, where he married Angeline Giuffra and had a daughter. During this time, he worked as a construction worker and a pianist. He received his first break in 1954  when Michael "Trigger Mike" Coppola arranged for him to appear with Jimmy Durante at the Boston Latin Quarter.

Career
He had success with the song "Mala Femmena" on his first album Showcase: Jimmy Roselli. It sold over three million records in 1963. It never was a hit song for him, but is considered his signature song. His only charting pop hit was a 1967 remake of "There Must Be a Way", a song previously recorded by Joni James. In addition to reaching No. 93 on the Billboard Hot 100 chart, "There Must Be a Way" was an easy-listening hit, reaching No. 13 in Billboard and No. 2 in Record World. He also had success with the song "All The Time" that same year. The song reached No. 19 on the Billboard easy listening chart. His third and last hit song was "Please Believe Me" in 1968. That song was No. 31 on the Billboard easy listening chart. Those were his only U.S. hit singles, although his version of "When Your Old Wedding Ring Was New" twice appeared in the UK Singles Chart. It peaked at number 51 in 1983, and number 52 in 1987.

At the beginning of his career, with appearances on The Ed Sullivan Show, with Jimmy Durante, and at the Copacabana, critics were calling him a "miracle". As New York magazine states, "guys were trying to put a stranglehold on him. He pushed them all away." Although he was on good terms with a number of mob chieftains, he claimed that he had "never done business with organized criminals". In 1970, Roselli refused Joseph Colombo's offer to sing at a concert that supported the Mob-controlled Italian American Anti-Defamation League. After this incident, Roselli was blackballed from singing in clubs and venues owned or controlled by Mafia associates. At times, he was relegated to selling his music out of the trunk of his car parked in Little Italy in Manhattan (he was the founder and owner of M&R Records).

Jimmy Roselli is a favorite among Italian-Americans and his signature tune "Mala Femmina" is featured twice in Martin Scorsese's Mean Streets. Roselli sang in perfect Neapolitan dialect. Other Neapolitan songs recorded by Roselli include "Core 'ngrato", "Anema e core" and "Scapricciatiello". Jerry Lewis said of him that "Roselli sings as an Italian should sing".

Later, as the influence of the Mafia waned, Roselli's career experienced a resurgence. In 1989, he found success in the United Kingdom when he played a series of concerts at the London Palladium. During the 1990s, he also headlined various shows at Trump Plaza Hotel and Casino in Atlantic City.

He sang the title song "Who Can Say?" for the 1966 Italian documentary film Africa Addio.

A book in the late 1990s entitled Making The Wiseguys Weep: The Jimmy Roselli Story was published by David Evanier. 
A feature film about Jimmy Roselli is being developed by James Ivory and Roger Birnbaum.

Joseph Pistone mentioned an incident he witnessed regarding Roselli during the Feast of San Gennaro in the former FBI agent's book, Donnie Brasco: My Undercover Life in the Mafia.

Death
Roselli died of heart failure in 2011 at his home in Clearwater, Florida.

Discography

 Showcase: Jimmy Roselli (1963)
 This Heart of Mine (1964)
 Life & Love Italian Style (1965)
 Mala Femmena (1965)
 The Great Ones (1965)
 Saloon Songs (1965)
 New York: My Port of Call (1965)
 Right from the Heart (1965)
 The Christmas Album (1966)
 The Italian Album (1966)
 Saloon Songs Vol. 2 (1967)
 Sold Out: Carnegie Hall Concert (1967)
 There Must Be a Way (1967)
 Rock-a-Bye Your Baby (1968)
 3 A.M. (1968)
 Core Spezzato (1969)
 Let Me Sing and I'm Happy (1969)
 It's Been Swell (1970)
 Jimmy Roselli (1971)
 Saloon Songs Vol. 3 (1971)
 Simmo 'E Napule... Paisa (1972)

Singles

References

External links
 New York Times book review, "The Wedding Singer: A biography of a crooner who never quite made the big time," by Vincent Patrick (December 27, 1998)

1925 births
2011 deaths
American crooners
American male singers
American people of Italian descent
Singers from New Jersey
Musicians from Hoboken, New Jersey
Torch singers
Traditional pop music singers
United Artists Records artists
United States Army personnel of World War II